İsdemir is a Turkish steel producer located in Payas, Hatay Province on the Mediterranean coast. The name is a contraction of the Turkish language İskenderun Demir ve Çelik A.Ş.,  which means "İskenderun Iron and Steel CO ". İsdemir is currently an Erdemir venture, another steel works located in Ereğli at the Black Sea coast.

Overview
Established in 1970 to produce long steel products, İskenderun Demir ve Çelik A.Ş. was incorporated into Erdemir Group on February 1, 2002. Production of flat steel began in 2008 at its İskenderun plant with the implementation of modernization and transformation investments so as to balance long and flat steel production levels in Turkey.

İsdemir plays a significant role in enhancing the capacity of flat steel production while carrying on its activities to manufacture long products such as billet and wire rod.

Located in a  area in Payas, İsdemir has an annual liquid steel production capacity of 5.3 Mt (million tonnes). In addition, it has reached 6 Mt of finished-product capacity, with 3.5 Mt of flat and 2.5 Mt of long steel products.

Pollution 
İsdemir burns coal in Turkey. As an integrated steelworks, emissions are higher than steel produced at electric arc furnaces. Climate Trace estimates the plant emitted 7.8 million tonnes of carbon dioxide in 2021, more greenhouse gas than any other steelmaker in the country.

Products
 Wire rod 5.5 mm – 16.0 mm (for manufacturing of wire and nail, wire mesh, electrode and welding filler, bolt and nut, spring)
 Pig iron (for foundry)
 Billet 100x100 mm – 180x180 mm (for manufacturing of plain and deformed reinforcing bar, angle and profile, bulb flat)

See also
List of steel producers 
List of companies of Turkey

References

External links
 İsdemir Web Site
 Haber7 
 Memurlar Net 

İskenderun
Companies listed on the Istanbul Stock Exchange
Steel companies of Turkey
Economy of Hatay
Manufacturing companies established in 1970
Soviet Union–Turkey relations
Coal in Turkey
Turkish companies established in 1970
Blast furnaces in Turkey